Oak Slush Creek is a stream in the U.S. state of Mississippi. It is a tributary of the Tombigbee River.

Oak Slush is a corrupted name derived from the Choctaw language purported to mean either "acorn mush" or "medicinal root".

See also
List of rivers of Mississippi

References

Rivers of Mississippi
Bodies of water of Lowndes County, Mississippi
Mississippi placenames of Native American origin